(locally ; literally "Old Swedish") is an Estonian Swedish dialect spoken in Gammalsvenskby, Ukraine.

History
It derives from the Estonian Swedish dialect of the late 1700s as spoken on the island of Dagö (Hiiumaa). While rooted in Swedish, the dialect shows influence and borrowings from Estonian, German, Russian, and Ukrainian.

Prior to 1929, Gammalsvenska remained the first language for the Ukrainian Swedes; however, the last generation of Swedish-first speakers were born just after World War II Sovietization policies. Marriage into non-Swedish families and social pressures diminished the teaching of Gammalsvenska by parents to their children. Since the 1950s a Russian-Ukrainian surzhyk has been the dominant language in the village, although some Standard Swedish is taught in schools where it is seen as economically advantageous for jobs in local tourism and other employment opportunities. Use of Gammalsvenska is restricted mostly to older ethnic Swedes born in the 1920s or 1930s.  only about 10 fluent Gammalsvenska speakers, all elderly women, were known in Ukraine.

In Meadows, Manitoba, where most of the immigrants from Gammalsvenskby to Canada eventually settled, Gammalsvenska was retained into the early 1900s. However, only a handful of elderly speakers remain.

Notes

References

External links

Gammalsvenska
Languages of Ukraine